Benny Leo Nielsen (born 26 March 1966 in Aalborg, Nordjylland) is a former butterfly and freestyle swimmer from Denmark, who won the silver medal in the 200 m butterfly at the 1988 Summer Olympics in Seoul, South Korea.

External links
 databaseOlympics
 

1966 births
Living people
Danish male freestyle swimmers
Danish male butterfly swimmers
Olympic swimmers of Denmark
Swimmers at the 1988 Summer Olympics
Olympic silver medalists for Denmark
Sportspeople from Aalborg
World Aquatics Championships medalists in swimming
European Aquatics Championships medalists in swimming
Medalists at the 1988 Summer Olympics
Olympic silver medalists in swimming